Rob Spivery (born January 9, 1949) is an American college basketball coach and the former head coach of the men's Jaguars basketball team at Southern University.  He previously held the same position at Alabama State University. He was hired as Southern's coach on May 5, 2005 and was given a five-year contract, paying $125,000 per annum.  On April 2, 2011 it was announced that Southern would not retain his services.

During his early career, Spivery played and coached professionally in Brazil for Trianon Club. He also served as an assistant coach for served as a men's assistant coach at Ashland University, Southern Illinois University and the University of Tulsa.

References

External links
 Southern profile

1949 births
Living people
Alabama State Hornets basketball coaches
American men's basketball coaches
American men's basketball players
Ashland Eagles men's basketball coaches
Ashland Eagles men's basketball players
Basketball coaches from Alabama
Basketball players from Alabama
College men's basketball head coaches in the United States
Grand View Vikings men's basketball players
Junior college men's basketball players in the United States
Montevallo Falcons men's basketball coaches
People from Phenix City, Alabama
Southern Illinois Salukis men's basketball coaches
Southern Jaguars basketball coaches
Tulsa Golden Hurricane men's basketball coaches